The Kleine Aue ("Little Aue") is a river of Lower Saxony, Germany. It discharges into the Große Aue ("Great Aue") from the left in Barenburg.

It is the lower one of two homonymous tributaries of that affluent of River Weser. Its entire course is lying in the district of Diepholz in the federal state of Lower Saxony.

Course 
The river rises southwest of Scholen, flows in a southerly direction through Schwaförden, west of the town of Sulingen and is joined by the Kuhbach stream. It then continues through Kirchdorf and discharges into the Große Aue at Barenburg.

See also
List of rivers of Lower Saxony

References

External links 
ELWAS, the Northrhine-Westphalian hydrological information board, with kilometring also in neighbouring regions

Rivers of Lower Saxony
Rivers of Germany